Charles DeLoss "Dee" Errickson (December 21, 1897 – September 22, 1985) was an American football and basketball coach and college athletics administrator. He served as the head football coach at Ottawa University from 1931 to 1935 and at Washburn University in 1944, retiring with a career college football coaching record of 19–27–1.
  Errickson was also the head basketball coach at Washburn from 1936 to 1946, tallying a mark of 67–122. In 1941, Errickson was named athletic director at Washburn.

Errickson was born on December 21, 1897 in Eureka, Kansas. He played basketball at Washburn before graduating in 1923. Errickson coached at Fort Scott Community College before moving on to Ottawa.  He died in Topeka, Kansas in 1985.

Head coaching record

Football

References

1897 births
1985 deaths
American men's basketball players
Basketball coaches from Kansas
Basketball players from Kansas
Ottawa Braves basketball coaches
Ottawa Braves football coaches
Washburn Ichabods athletic directors
Washburn Ichabods football coaches
Washburn Ichabods men's basketball coaches
Washburn Ichabods men's basketball players
People from Eureka, Kansas